Michael O'Halloran is a 1948 American drama film directed by John Rawlins and starring Scotty Beckett, Allene Roberts and Tommy Cook. It is an adaptation of the novel of the same name by Gene Stratton-Porter. It was distributed by Monogram Pictures. The film's art direction was by Lucius O. Croxton.

Plot

Cast
 Scotty Beckett as Michael O'Halloran  
 Allene Roberts as Lily Nelson  
 Tommy Cook as Joey 
 Isabel Jewell as Mrs. Laura Nelson  
 Charles Arnt as Doc Douglas Bruce  
 Jonathan Hale as Judge Schaffner  
 Gladys Blake as Saleslady  
 Roy Gordon as Dr. Carrell  
 Florence Auer as Mrs. Jane Crawford  
 William Haade as Detective Benson  
 Dorothy Granger as Ward Nurse  
 Douglas Evans as Dr. Johnson  
 Beverly Jons as Student Nurse  
 Gregg Barton as Officer Barker  
 Lee Phelps as Officer Lounergan  
 Harry Strang as Officer Lee Martin  
 Mark Roberts as Pete  
 Ethyl May Halls as Woman  
 Ralph Brooks as Interne  
 Robert Haines as Stenotype Operator

References

Bibliography
 John Flowers & Paul Frizler. Psychotherapists on Film, 1899-1999: M-Z. McFarland, 2004.

External links
 

1948 films
1948 drama films
American drama films
Films directed by John Rawlins
Monogram Pictures films
Films based on American novels
Remakes of American films
Films based on works by Gene Stratton-Porter
American black-and-white films
1940s English-language films
1940s American films